Sergeant First Class (SFC) is typically a senior non-commissioned officer rank, used in many countries.

United States Army

Sergeant First Class (SFC) is the seventh enlisted rank (E-7) in the U.S. Army, ranking above staff sergeant (E-6) and below master sergeant and first sergeant (E-8), and is the first non-commissioned officer rank designated as a senior non-commissioned officer (SNCO).

A sergeant first class is typically assigned as a platoon sergeant at the company level or battalion operations non-commissioned officer in charge at the battalion level, but may also hold other positions depending on the type of unit. In a combat arms role, a sergeant first class is typically second in charge (under an officer, typically a second lieutenant, serving as the platoon leader) of from 14 soldiers and four tanks in an armor platoon to 36 soldiers and four squads in a rifle platoon. A sergeant first class's primary responsibilities are tactical logistics, tactical casualty evacuations, and serving as the senior tactical adviser to the platoon leader.  Sergeant first class replaced the rank of technical sergeant in 1948. (However, the U.S. Air Force, which separated from the Army in 1947, retained the rank of technical sergeant and the U.S. Marine Corps had the rank of technical sergeant until 1959.)

A sergeant first class is addressed as "sergeant" except in certain situations, such as field artillery units, in which a sergeant first class serving as platoon sergeant is commonly referred to as "Smoke." If a sergeant first class is appointed to fill the role of first sergeant, he or she is addressed as "First Sergeant." Typically a sergeant first class assigned on a manning document to fill a first sergeant role while being promotable to master sergeant can be frocked to first sergeant rank and hold the insignia due its position.

Sergeant first class is the first enlisted rank in the U.S. Army to be selected by the centralized promotion system. As such, it is considerably more difficult to achieve than the previous ranks. A sergeant first class is the first enlisted rank to be considered a senior non-commissioned officer, and a soldier achieving the rank gains not only prestige, but several benefits due to the position. Contrary to popular belief due to a common apocryphal saying, it does not take an act of Congress to reduce a sergeant first class in rank. The reduction authority from sergeant first class to staff sergeant is reserved for Commanders of organizations authorized a commander in the rank of colonel or higher. For separate detachments or companies, the reduction authority will be the next higher headquarters within the chain of command. The higher headquarters must be authorized by a commander in the rank of colonel or higher.

The rank title of sergeant first class (SFC) existed in the Army from 1890  until 1920 when it was eliminated in an army-wide simplification of enlisted ranks which had grown into a system containing 128 different rank insignia. The rank of SFC was used in several technical branches such as the Army Medical Department and in the Ordnance, Signal, and Quartermaster Corps and was equivalent to the field service ranks at the company/battery/troop "staff" NCO level, such as color sergeant, supply sergeant, or radio sergeant. The Army restored the rank of SFC in 1948 when it replaced technical sergeant.

Gallery

See also
 Military rank
 Sergeant
 Comparative military ranks
 United States Army enlisted rank insignia of World War I
 United States Army enlisted rank insignia of World War II
 U.S. Army enlisted rank insignia
 United States military pay

References

Military ranks of the United States Army
United States military enlisted ranks